Symmetrischema borsaniella is a moth in the family Gelechiidae. It was described by Paul Köhler in 1939. It is found in Argentina.

References

Symmetrischema
Moths described in 1939